Theodore Boone: The Fugitive is the fifth book in the Theodore Boone series written by John Grisham.  It was released May 12, 2015.

Plot
Theodore Boone goes to Washington D.C on a school trip. He wanders away from his school party and gets on the subway where he sees Pete Duffy. Pete Duffy skipped town after his trial for murder was declared a mistrial (in Theodore Boone: Kid Lawyer). Theo wants to bring him to justice.

Reception
Common Sense Media found "Like all good detective stories, this one is hard to put down."
Jess Hockey for The Guardian said "Theodore Boone is back with a bang." and "It is fast-paced and you never want to put this book down; it entices you into reading more and more."

References

External links

 at Penguin Group

2015 American novels
2015 children's books
Novels by John Grisham
American children's novels
E. P. Dutton books
Hodder & Stoughton books